Forest-en-Cambrésis is a commune in the Nord department in northern France.

Heraldry

See also
Communes of the Nord department

References

External links

 Official Web site

Forestencambresis